Sloat may refer to:

People
Sloat (surname)

Other uses
Sloat, California, in Plumas County
USS Sloat, ships named after John D. Sloat
Sloat House, in New York State
Wingtip Sloat, an indie rock band from Virginia.